Niali is a Tehsil headquarter in Cuttack district of Odisha. It is famous for the shrine of Sobhaneswar, a Shiva Temple. Niali is situated at a distance of 42 km from Cuttack, the district headquarters. 

Tourism

Sobhaneswar Mahadev temple is a 12th-century heritage site at Niali. The temple was built during the Ganga rule possibly during the last part of the reign of Anangbhima dev (1190–98). Details of this temple are chronicled in the archaeological section of Indira Gandhi centre for the Arts. There is an archaeological sculpture shed here by the state archaeological department. There is a huge sculpture of a bull in front of the temple said to be the largest in India.

Madhaba Temple is located at a distance of 8 km from Niali. The temple is dedicated to Lord Vishnu. The significance of the temple is that Garuda (the carrier of Lord Vishnu) is worshipped here. Madhabananda Jew is said to be the maternal uncle of Lord Jagannath.

How to reach

Air 

The nearest Airport is located at Bhubaneswar about 30 km from the town.

Rail 

The nearest Railway stations from Niali are Bhubaneswar (30 km) and Cuttack (47 km)

Road 

State Highway No. 60 connects Niali with Bhubaneswar via Phulanakhara and Cuttack. Niali is connected by road with Konark Sun Temple (35 km), Kakatpur Mangala temple (26 km) and Puri Jagannath temple (60 km).

Medical

Politics 

Niali is an assembly constituency in Odisha legislative assembly. It is presently represented by Dr Pramod Kumar Mallick of Biju Janata Dal (BJD). Mallick won the seat thrice in a row on behalf of BJD in 2009, 2014 and 2019 elections. Earlier it was known as Govindpur constituency and was represented by Rabindra Kumar Mallick in 1990 and in 2004. Panchanan Kanungo won the seat in 1995 and 2000. Niali is part of Jagatsinghpur lok sabha constituency and presently represented by Dr Rajashri Mallick of BJD.

References
https://odishatourguide.com/offbeat_places/sobhaneswara-temple/

Cities and towns in Cuttack district
Cuttack